Nicolas La Grange (1707–1775)  was a French playwright and translator, notable for his 1768 translation of Lucretius' De Rerum Natura and for several plays.

La Grange served as private tutor to the children of the French Enlightenment philosopher Baron d'Holbach and collaborated with Jacques-André Naigeon in translating the works of Seneca.

Works (selection) 
1758: Oeuvres de théâtre de M. de La Grange. Duchesne, Paris 
1770: Le bon tuteur, et l'indolent.  Libr. assoc., La Haye 
1772: Les contre-temps: Comédie.

References

External links 
 Œuvres de Theatre de M. de La Grange at Google Books
 Adriene; ou, Les aventures de la marquise de *** at the Internet Archive

1707 births
1767 deaths
18th-century French dramatists and playwrights
French translators
18th-century French translators